Magdalen Nabb (16 January 1947 – 18 August 2007) was a British author, best known for the Marshal Guarnaccia detective novels.

Born in Church, a village near Accrington in Lancashire as Magdalen Nuttal, she was educated at the Convent Grammar School, Bury, before going on to art college in Manchester, where she studied arts and pottery, which she taught in an art school. In 1975 she moved to Florence in Italy with her son, Liam, even though she didn't speak Italian. There, she continued to work on pottery in Montelupo, a pottery town near Florence, and began writing. It was in Montelupo that she met the model for "Marshal Guarnaccia". Her first book, Death of an Englishman, was first published in 1981. All her stories take place in Florence, which she describes as a "very secret city". She lived near enough to the Carabinieri station at Pitti to stroll there regularly and have a chat with the marshal, who kept her up to date on crime in the city. She was admired by and became friends with the writer Georges Simenon. 

She also wrote the Josie Smith books for children and did occasional journalistic pieces for English, German and Italian papers. In 1991 she won the Nestlé Smarties Book Prize for Josie Smith and Eileen, the second book in the series. 

Her final novel, Vita Nuova in the Marshal Guarnaccia series, was posthumously published in 2008.

She died in Florence of a stroke, aged 60.

Books for adults 

 The Prosecutor, 1986, co-authored by Paolo Vagheggi
 Cosimo, 2004

Maresciallo Guarnaccia series
 Death of an Englishman, 1981
 Death of a Dutchman, 1982
 Death in Springtime, 1983
 Death in Autumn, 1985
 The Marshal and the Murderer, 1987
 The Marshal and the Madwoman, 1988
 The Marshal's Own Case, 1990
 The Marshal Makes His Report, 1991
 The Marshal at the Villa Torrini, 1993
 The Monster of Florence, 1996
 Property of Blood, 1999
 Some Bitter Taste, 2002
 The Innocent, 2005
 Vita Nuova, 2008

Books for children 

 The Enchanted Horse (Illustrated by Julek Heller), 1993
 Twilight Ghost, 2000

Josie Smith series 
 Josie Smith, 1989
 Josie Smith and Eileen, 1991, won the Nestlé Smarties Book Prize
 Josie Smith at Christmas, 1992
 Josie Smith at the Seaside, 1993
 Josie Smith at School, 1994
 Josie Smith in Hospital, 1995
 Josie Smith at the Market, 1996
 Josie Smith in Summer, 1997
 Josie Smith in Winter, 1998
 Josie Smith in Spring, 1999
 Josie Smith in Autumn, 2000

References

External links
 
Obituary in The Times, 23 August 2007
Obituary in The Telegraph, 22 August 2007
Obituary in The Guardian, 27 August 2007
Obituary in The New York Times, 28 August 2007
2004 interview, last of 8 linked parts – Part Eight featuring The Monster of Florence, website Italian-Mysteries.com 
 

1947 births
2007 deaths
People from Church, Lancashire
English artists
English crime fiction writers
English children's writers
Women mystery writers
20th-century English novelists
20th-century British women writers